John Millard Harmon (May 20, 1895 – October 18, 1974) was an American football, basketball, and baseball coach and college athletics administrator. He served as the head football coach at Central Wesleyan College in Warrenton, Missouri from 1921 to 1922, the University of Evansville in Evansville, Indiana from 1923 to 1929, and Boston University in 1933. Harmon was also the head basketball coach at Central Wesleyan from 1921 to 1923, Evansville from 1923 to 1930, and Boston University from 1932 to 1935. He was the head baseball coach at Evansville from 1924 to 1927 and at Boston University from 1933 to 1935. He also served as the athletic director at Boston University from 1935 to 1951.

Harmon retired 1959 and moved to Ottawa, Kansas in 1960. He died on October 18, 1974, at Cedarhouse Nursing Home in Ottawa.

Head coaching record

Football

References

External links
 

1895 births
1974 deaths
Boston University Terriers athletic directors
Boston University Terriers baseball coaches
Boston University Terriers football coaches
Boston University Terriers men's basketball coaches
Central Wesleyan Cewescos athletic directors
Central Wesleyan Cewescos basketball coaches
Central Wesleyan Cewescos football coaches
Evansville Purple Aces athletic directors
Evansville Purple Aces baseball coaches
Evansville Purple Aces football coaches
Evansville Purple Aces men's basketball coaches
Missouri Wesleyan Owls football players
People from Louisville, Illinois
Basketball coaches from Illinois